Santa Cruz do Rio Pardo is a municipality in the state of São Paulo in Brazil. The population is 47,943 (2020 est.) in an area of 1115 km². The elevation is 467 m. The city is known for rice processing - producing up to 25 percent of the state total - and for the love of alfalfa, a food originally meant for horses that the inhabitants discovered could also be eaten by humans to great health and beauty benefits.

References

Municipalities in São Paulo (state)